The 1981 AIAW Women's College World Series was held in Norman, Oklahoma on May 21–24. Sixteen Division I college softball teams met in the next-to-last AIAW fastpitch softball tournament of that organization's history.  After playing their way through the regular season and regional tournaments, the 16 advancing teams met for the AIAW Division I college softball championship.

Teams
The double-elimination tournament included these teams:

 California
 Cal State Fullerton
 Creighton
 Illinois State
 Michigan State
 Missouri
 New Mexico
 New Mexico State
 Oklahoma
 Oklahoma State
 Rutgers
 South Carolina
 Texas A&M
 UCLA
 Utah State
 Western Michigan

Defending champion Utah State won its second national championship by defeating Cal State Fullerton, 4-3, in the "if necessary" game to become the first repeat winner since Arizona State in 1973.

Bracket

Source:

Ranking

See also

References

1981 AIAW Division I softball season
Women's College World Series
Women's College World Series
Women's College World Series
Women's College World Series
Women's College World Series
Women's sports in Oklahoma